Saleh Kamba is a Ugandan accountant and politician. He was appointed State Minister for Bunyoro Affairs in the Office of the Prime Minister in the Cabinet of Uganda on 27 May 2011. However, the Ugandan parliament refused to confirm his appointment. He is also the elected Member of Parliament for Kibuku County, Kibuku District.

He is currently the Resident District Commissioner of Nakasongola district.

See also
Cabinet of Uganda
Parliament of Uganda
Kibuku District

References

External links
Full of List of Ugandan Cabinet Ministers May 2011

Living people
1971 births
People from Kibuku District
Ugandan accountants
Government ministers of Uganda
Members of the Parliament of Uganda
National Resistance Movement politicians
21st-century Ugandan politicians